The consensus 1950 College Basketball All-American team, as determined by aggregating the results of five major All-American teams.  To earn "consensus" status, a player must win honors from a majority of the following teams: the Associated Press, Look Magazine, The United Press International, Collier's Magazine and the International News Service.

1950 Consensus All-America team

Individual All-America teams

AP Honorable Mention

 Billy Joe Adcock, Vanderbilt
 Leon Blevins, Arizona
 Ron Bontemps, Beloit
 Clarence Brannum, Kansas State
 Art Burris, Tennessee
 Gerald Calabrese, St. John's
 Buddy Cate, Western Kentucky
 Chuck Cooper, Duquesne
 Ed Dahler, Duquesne
 Loy Doty, Wyoming
 Nate DeLong, River Falls Teachers
 Bill Erickson, Illinois
 Larry Foust, La Salle
 Bill Garrett, Indiana
 Ed Gayda, Washington State
 Chet Giermak, William & Mary
 Rick Harman, Kansas State
 Hal Haskins, Hamline
 Rene Herrerias, San Francisco
 Walter Hirsch, Kentucky
 George King, Morris Harvey
 Bob Lavoy, Western Kentucky
 Jim Line, Kentucky
 Al McGuire, St. John's
 Gene Melchiorre, Bradley
 Ken Murray, St. Bonaventure
 Ralph O'Brien, Butler
 Frank Oftring, Holy Cross
 John Pilch, Wyoming
 Jack Shelton, Oklahoma A&M
 Jim Slaughter, South Carolina
 George Stanich, UCLA
 Lou Watson, Indiana
 Bus Whitehead, Nebraska
 Zeke Zawoluk, St. John's

See also
 1949–50 NCAA men's basketball season

References

NCAA Men's Basketball All-Americans
All-Americans